The September 2020 European Masters was a professional ranking snooker tournament which took place from 21 to 27 September 2020 at the Marshall Arena in Milton Keynes, England. Organised by the World Professional Billiards and Snooker Association, it was the first completed ranking event of the 2020–21 season. The competition was the 22nd edition of the European Masters, first held in 1989 and the second held in 2020 after the January 2020 European Masters. The event featured 128 participants with five withdrawing from the event due to COVID-19 and another (Mark Davis) because of his  being stolen. The winner of the event won £80,000 from a total prize fund of £407,000. The event was sponsored by betting company BetVictor.

Neil Robertson was the defending champion, having defeated Zhou Yuelong in a 9–0 whitewash in the previous season's final. However, Robertson was defeated 4–5 by Shaun Murphy in the quarter-finals. Mark Selby won the event after he defeated Martin Gould on a  9–8. There were 98 century breaks made during the tournament, the highest of which was a 145 made by Mark Allen. He also equalled the most consecutive century breaks, scoring four in succession in his 5–0 second round win over Ken Doherty.

Format
The September 2020 European Masters was a professional snooker tournament and the second tournament of the 2020–21 snooker season. The event was played between 21 and 27 September 2020 at the Marshall Arena in Milton Keynes, England. The arena will host the first eight tournaments of the season with events being moved to help reduce the spread during the COVID-19 pandemic. This was the 22nd edition of the European Masters tournament, the first having been held as the European Open in 1989. It was the second European Masters tournament to take place in 2020, after the 2020 European Masters held between 22 and 26 January was won by Neil Robertson who defeated Zhou Yuelong 9–0 in the final.

The event featured 128 competitors with 124 participants from the World Snooker Tour with four additional places given to the four highest ranked players from continental Europe on the 2020 Q School Order of Merit. Matches at the event were played as the best-of-9  until the semi-finals – played as best-of-11 – and final, a best-of-17 played over two .

Prize fund
The event had a total prize fund of £407,000 with the winner receiving £80,000. This was the same as that of the previous event in 2020. A breakdown of prize money for the event is shown below:

 Winner: £80,000
 Runner-up: £35,000
 Semi-final: £17,500
 Quarter-final: £11,000
 Last 16: £6,000
 Last 32: £4,000
 Last 64: £3,000
 Highest : £5,000
 Total: £407,000

Summary

The tournament began on 21 September 2020. During the first round, the World Snooker Tour announced that two players had tested positive for COVID-19. The players, Daniel Wells and Gary Wilson withdrew from the event. A further three players also withdrew as Elliot Slessor and David Lilley had both been in contact with Wilson, while Michael White came into proximity to Wells. Having received a walkover in the first round, the 2020 World Snooker Championship winner Ronnie O'Sullivan met new professional Aaron Hill. Hill took a lead of 3–1 before O'Sullivan won three frames to lead. Hill won the next two frames to win the match 5–4. Hill suggested that comments made by O'Sullivan about the quality of newer players inspired his performance. Hill commented that they were at the "back of [his] mind" during the match and "that one day I am going to show him what I can do. I think today was the day."

Newly professional player Peter Devlin defeated three-time world champion Mark Williams 5–4. In his second round 5–0 win over Ken Doherty, Mark Allen made breaks of 134, 101, 141 and 145 in a row. This was only the sixth time a player had made four consecutive century breaks in a professional match. It was also his seventh century in his first two matches.

Mark Davis withdrew ahead of his third round match with Mark Selby. His  was stolen after he left it resting against his car after leaving the hotel. Davis offered a £1,000 reward for the return of the cue, which he had played with for more than 20 years. Cue manufacturer John Parris also offered a new cue to be made as a reward for its return. Davis' cue was returned before the end of the tournament. This was Selby's second walkover of the tournament, having also been drawn against Michael White. In the fourth round, Selby was 1–4 behind against Stuart Bingham but made four breaks above 50 to win the match 5–4.

The quarter-finals and semi-finals were played on 26 September 2020. Two-time winner Judd Trump took a 4–0 lead over Kyren Wilson in the quarter-finals and eventually won 5–2, whilst defending champion Neil Robertson lost to Shaun Murphy on a deciding frame. Ding Junhui won only one frame as he was defeated by Mark Selby 1–5. The final quarter-final went to a deciding frame as Martin Gould defeated Yan Bingtao 5–4. Both semi-finals were also played on the 26 September, but as the best-of-11 frames. Selby met Murphy in a match and took a 5–1 lead, but missed chances in the next two frames before winning the match 6–3. The other semi-final saw Gould defeat world number one Trump by the same scoreline to reach his first ranking final since the 2016 German Masters.

The final was played on 27 September as the best-of-17 frames held over two sessions and was refereed by Ben Williams. Selby was contesting for his 18th ranking title, whereas Gould had only won the 2016 German Masters previously.

On the resumption of the match, Gould won the ninth frame with a break of 94, before Selby won frame 10 to tie the match at 5–5. Gould then won frame 11 with a break of 65, before Selby tied the match again at 6–6 with a break of 113. Selby won frame 13 but the match was tied again at 7–7 after a break of 107 by Gould in the next frame. Selby then potted the remaining balls to win the frame and lead 8–7. Gould tied the match up and forced a deciding frame with a break of 96. The 17th frame was won by Selby who made a break of 72 to win the match. Following the tournament, Gould rose 17 places in the world rankings from 53 to 36th. This was the tenth final win in a row for Selby, who commented: "From being 4–0 down Martin played fantastically well to get back into the match and after that it was nip-and-tuck. It could have gone either way."

Tournament draw
The results from the event are shown below. Players in bold denote match winners, whilst numbers in brackets display player seedings. Some matches involved a withdrawn player, denoted by "w/d" with players receiving a bye as "w/o".

Top half

Section 1

Section 2

Section 3

Section 4

Bottom half

Section 5

Section 6

Section 7

Section 8

Finals

Final

Century breaks
There was a total of 98 century breaks made during the tournament, the highest of which was a 145 made by Mark Allen in frame four of his second round win over Ken Doherty.

145, 141, 135, 134, 114, 104, 104, 101, 101  Mark Allen
140, 121, 111  David Gilbert
139  Zhao Xintong
138, 136, 132, 125, 113, 112  Stuart Bingham
138, 121, 101  Mark Williams
137, 115, 110, 105, 102  Shaun Murphy
135  Fergal O'Brien
134  Ken Doherty
133, 126, 115  Yan Bingtao
132, 123, 105, 105, 100  Judd Trump
132  Ashley Carty
132  Jimmy White
132  Rory McLeod
132  Sunny Akani
131, 130, 120  Jamie Clarke
131, 107, 102  Martin Gould
130, 129, 100  Pang Junxu
130, 114, 113, 111  Mark Selby
130  Jackson Page
129, 129, 104  Martin O'Donnell
129, 105, 100  Anthony McGill
129, 102  Allan Taylor
129  James Cahill
125  Jak Jones
120, 106, 100  Kyren Wilson
117, 116  Luo Honghao
117  Chang Bingyu
117  Graeme Dott
115  Luca Brecel
113, 105, 102  Barry Hawkins
113  Ryan Day
111  Joe Perry
109  Anthony Hamilton
109  Jamie Jones
109  Li Hang
109  Alexander Ursenbacher
108  Mitchell Mann
107  Ding Junhui
107  Matthew Stevens
106, 101  Lyu Haotian
104  Andrew Higginson
103  Simon Lichtenberg
102, 100, 100  Neil Robertson
102  Peter Devlin
102  Jack Lisowski
102  Florian Nüßle
102  Ronnie O'Sullivan
100  Aaron Hill
100  Hossein Vafaei

Coverage
The event was broadcast by Eurosport in Europe and Australia; Superstar Online, Liaoning TV, Youku, Zhibo.tv and Migu in China; Now TV in Hong Kong; True Sport in Thailand; Sports Cast in Taiwan and Sky Sports in New Zealand. In other territories without official broadcasters, the event was streamed online by Matchroom Sport. The tournament was sponsored by betting company BetVictor.

References

European Masters (2)
European Masters (2)
2020
European Masters
Sport in Milton Keynes
Snooker competitions in England
European Masters